Witthawin Klorwuttiwat (born August 29, 1991) is a Thai professional footballer who plays as a centre back for Thai League 1 club Lamphun Warrior.

Honour
 Lamphun Warrior
 Thai League 3 (1): 2020–21
 Thai League 2 (1): 2021–22

References

External links

1991 births
Living people
Witthawin Klorwuttiwat
Witthawin Klorwuttiwat
Association football defenders
Witthawin Klorwuttiwat
Witthawin Klorwuttiwat
Witthawin Klorwuttiwat
Witthawin Klorwuttiwat
Witthawin Klorwuttiwat